This is a list of the busiest railway stations in North America. The figures are collected by the operating agencies of each railway station, and are estimates based on ticket usage data, crowd sizes and other extrapolations.  

The ranking is based on annual passengers traveling by passenger rail or commuter rail; other visitors are not included. For example, Grand Central Terminal, a major attraction in New York City, sees nearly 500,000 people daily to shop, dine, conduct business, meet family and friends, or admire the station. As well, nearly 45 million passengers use the nearby subway station each year. Because these people are not using passenger or commuter rail services, they are not included in Grand Central's passenger count.

List
As of 2018, stations that see at least 10 million annual passengers include:

See also
List of busiest Amtrak stations
List of busiest railway stations in Europe
List of busiest railway stations in Great Britain

Notes

References

Rail transport-related lists of superlatives
Transport in North America